Chemische Industrie Uithoorn (Cindu, later Cindu Chemicals) was a chemical company in Uithoorn, Netherlands specialising in processing from coal tar. The company was founded in 1922 as Teerbedrijf Uithoorn (TEBU), and operated under a number of company names. It was acquired by Koppers in 2010 and renamed Koppers Netherlands.

A subsidiary producing polymers from tar derived chemicals was formed in 1960 as Neville Cindu Chemie (later Nevcin Polymers) and operated from the same site in Uithoorn. A reactor at the factory exploded in 1992, causing three deaths and several injuries.

Cindu ceased operations in 2014.

History
Industrial chemical activity in Uithoorn dates to at least 1863; the Koninklijke Chemische Fabriek produced primarily Sulphuric acid the site. The company was acquired by rival sulphuric acid produced Ketjen en Co. who concentrated their manufacturing capacity in Amsterdam. The plant in Uithoorn closed, and was sold for demolition in 1916. In 1922 the factory was acquired by J.A. van Seumeren who created a tar processing facility under the company Teerbedrijf Uithoorn (TEBU). Koninklijke Hoogovens acquired a stake in the company in 1927.

In 1952/3 the company merged with the Utrechtsche Asphaltfabriek NV in 1952 to form Teerunie NV, in 1959 the company was renamed Chemische Industrie Uithoorn (CINDU). In 1953 a sales subsidiary (TEBU France) was established in France in 1953. (sold to the van Dijk family 1979 and now tebu-bio).

During the 1970s pollution from in the Uithoorn area became a major source for public concern - Cindu was a major polluter. A public group werkgroep Cindroom was formed by concerned residents of Uithoorn. During the 1970s new environmental protection laws were introduced in the Netherlands, including air quality, and odor nuisance regulations. Before emission control mechanisms were introduced the Cindu plant was estimated to emit ~200t per year into the air. Discharges causing water pollution also exceeded standards, which the company could not realistically meet; exceptions to discharge limits were granted to 1988 whilst the company and authorities sought solutions.

In 1991 the Cindu group (including subsidiaries) employed over 1700 of which over 500 were employed in Uithorn including about 120 at the Nevcin joint venture.

Cindu's parent holding company Cindu International NV (formerly named Cindu - Key & Kramer NV) owned interests in a number of other companies, Cindu International was split up in 1997, and delisted 1999. The coal tar activities at Uithoorn continued after 1997 as Cindu Chemicals, (50% owned by Koninklijke Hoogovens), as well as the joint venture Nevcin Polymers.

In 1992 three people died after an explosion at the factory.
In 2001 a storage tank for Naphthalene cracked; the resultant odor brought complaints about the odor of (moth balls), which was reported as far away as England.

The plant was sold to Koppers Inc. in 2010 and ceased operations in 2014.

Joint ventures and subsidiaries

Nevcin
Neville Cindu Chemie was founded in 1959 as a 50:50 joint venture located in Uithorn,  between Cindu International and Neville Chemical. The company manufactured organic resins. The company was renamed Nevcin Polymers in 1984.

On 8 July 1992 an overheating vessel at the Nevcin site exploded, resulting in a fire; three people were killed and eleven wounded. The accident was caused by the reaction vessel being wrongly filled with the reactive chemical Dicyclopentadiene the previous day.

In 1999 Neville chemicals became sole owner of the company. The company was renamed Neville Chemical Europe BV from the beginning of 2003. In October 2011 the company was sold to Resinall Rutgers Resins (Germany).

TTS
Tanker Transport Services BV (TTS) was established in 1965; it was the water transportation subsidiary of Cindu, operating tanker barges. It became a separate company in 2002 through a management buyout.

Products

Cindu chemicals
In 2007 Cindu's output included Naphthalene, Creosote, Carbon black and Pitch used for the production of carbon electrodes, and also bitumen emulsions for road construction.

The primary process carried out the site was by distillation at 350C, in addition to further purification processes. The primary source of raw material (tar) was Koninklijke Hoogovens, tar from the plant was shipped by barge to Uithoorn.

As of 2012 the plant had a capacity to process 140000t of tar per year.

Nevcin
Nevcin synthesises hydrocarbon resins, using distillates from cracking of the naphtha fraction, with polymerisation feedstock including isoprene, piperylene and cyclopentadiene (or dicyclopentadiene dimer) as well as styrene and styrene-type products including vinyltoluene, indene, methylindene and alpha-methylstyrene. Resins derived from Coumarone (Benzofuran) and indene are also produced.

Notes

References

Sources

External links
Cindu
, archive of company website
,  company webpage
Nevcin
, company website;Nevcin
tebu-bio
, company website

Chemical companies of the Netherlands
Uithoorn